Jumbilla is a town in Northern Peru, capital of the province Bongará in the region Amazonas, located at an altitude of 1935m.

References

Populated places in the Amazonas Region